Mistretta (Sicilian: Mistritta) is a comune (municipality) in the Metropolitan City of Messina in the Italian region Sicily, located about  east of Palermo and about  west of Messina.

Mistretta borders the following municipalities: Capizzi, Caronia, Castel di Lucio, Cerami, Nicosia, Pettineo, Reitano, Santo Stefano di Camastra.

People
 Ernesto Almirante (1877–1964)

References

External links
 Official website

Cities and towns in Sicily